The Godmakers may refer to:
 The God Makers (film), a 1982 anti-Mormon film produced by Ed Decker, or the book of the same title by Decker and Dave Hunt
 The God Makers II, the film's sequel, or the book of the same title
 The Godmakers (novel), a 1972 science fiction novel by Frank Herbert
 Godmakers, an album by The Red Death